Awa Dioum-Ndiaye (also spelled N'Diaye; born 21 November 1961) is a retired track and field athlete from Senegal who competed in the hurdling, high jump and the heptathlon events during her career in the 1980s. She is best known for winning the gold medal in the women's high jump contest at the 1987 All-Africa Games. She was twice winner at the African Championships in Athletics, winning in 1984 and 1985—the first athlete to win it twice.

International competitions

External links

1961 births
Living people
Senegalese female hurdlers
Senegalese female high jumpers
Senegalese heptathletes
Heptathletes
Senegalese female athletes
African Games gold medalists for Senegal
African Games medalists in athletics (track and field)
Athletes (track and field) at the 1987 All-Africa Games
20th-century Senegalese women